Barbara Astman RCA is a Canadian artist who specializes in a hybrid of photography and new media, often using her own body as object and subject, merging art and technology.

Early life
Astman was born in Rochester, New York, the second of three children of Bertha (née Meisel, a homemaker) and George Astman (an auto mechanic and salesman.) She received her associate degree  at the Rochester Institute of Technology's School for American Craftsmen.  In 1970, she moved to Toronto, Ontario, Canada to study at the Ontario College of Art (now OCAD University,) and graduated with an associate degree (A.O.C.A.).

Artistic career
Astman's practice is partly composed of public art installations in Canada and abroad, including an installation at the Calgary Winter Olympics in 1987.  Recently, she completed a project for the new Canadian Embassy in Berlin, Germany consisting of a fritted glass tower wall. She joined the faculty of OCAD in 1975 and is a Professor in the Faculty of Art.

Early career
In the 1970s, she began exploring Polaroid technology and Xerography as a vehicle for art making.  She moved to Toronto in 1970 to attend OCAD. Wanting to explore the city she found inspiration in Kensington Market, Spadina Avenue and Queen Street West. Her first successful solo show was held in 1973, at Toronto's Baldwin Street Gallery of Photography. Two years later, the Still Photography Division of the National Film Board of Canada now called the Canadian Museum of Contemporary Photography, Ottawa hosted her first museum show. Astman began the Colour Xerox Artist's Program at Visual Arts Ontario in 1977. She sat on the board of directors at the Art Gallery at Harbourfront (now called The Power Plant) from 1983 to 1985. Since then, other board positions have included: the City of Toronto, Public Art Commission; the Curatorial Team for the International WaterWorks Exhibition in 1988. Her initial commercial venture was the creation of the album cover for the first Loverboy record for CBS Records.

Mid career
Liz Wylie curated Astman's mid-career retrospective, Barbara Astman: Person/Persona A 20 Year Survey Exhibition in 1995.  It opened at the Art Gallery of Hamilton, and then toured three other Canadian museums. The Art Gallery of Ontario reopened in 2008, after a year's redevelopment by architect Frank Gehry. Astman and AGO Assistant Curator Georgiana Uhlyarik were chosen to co-curate an exhibit focusing on Joyce Weiland and early feminist practice.

Barbara Astman has been heavily inspired by stores, even creating her own as an art work: Dancing with Che: Enter Through the Gift Shop (2011–13). Che Guevara's face appears on mugs, plates, and other novelty goods, though none are for sale.

She also works with fabrics and in 2013 Astman worked with designer Jeremy Liang to create a line of limited edition silk scarves based on her Newspaper Series (2006-2008) for Jonathan and Olivia fashion boutique in Toronto.

Her artist's archives are held in the E.P. Taylor Research Library & Archives, Art Gallery of Ontario.

Awards
In 2000 she was elected to the Royal Canadian Academy.

Public collections
Astman's work is held in the following permanent collections, among others:
 Agnes Etherington Art Centre, Queen's University, Kingston, ON
Art Gallery of Hamilton, Hamilton, ON
Art Gallery of Ontario, Toronto, ON
 Bibliothèque Nationale, Paris
Burnaby Art Gallery, Burnaby, British Columbia
 The Robert McLaughlin Gallery, Oshawa, ON
 George Eastman Museum, Rochester, New York
 McIntosh Gallery, University of Western Ontario, London, ON
Museum of Fine Arts, Houston
 National Gallery of Canada, Ottawa
The University of Toronto Art Museum
Oklahoma City Museum of Art
 Victoria and Albert Museum, London
 Winnipeg Art Gallery, Winnipeg, MB

Critical reception

The Clementine Suite 
"...a celebration of the human spirit."

Dancing With Che 
"...echoes across more than a century of technological innovation and evolution of the medium".
"Audacious, humorous, improbable."

Wonderland 
"Intimate, personal, and quietly enthralling."

References

External links 
 CCCA Artist Database
 Finding aid to Barbara Astman archives at Art Gallery of Ontario
 

1950 births
Artists from Rochester, New York
Canadian mixed media artists
Artists from Toronto
Canadian contemporary artists
Canadian multimedia artists
Canadian photographers
Members of the Royal Canadian Academy of Arts
Living people
OCAD University alumni
20th-century Canadian women artists
20th-century Canadian artists